Madat Gazanfar oglu Guliyev (born 27 September 1958, Kirovabad / Ganja, Azerbaijan SSR, USSR) - The National Hero of Azerbaijan, Colonel-General, Martial Artist; Minister of Defence Industry of Azerbaijan (2019-), Chief of State Security Service of The Republic of Azerbaijan (2015-2019), Deputy Minister of Justice of the Republic of Azerbaijan and the head of the Penitentiary Service (2011-2015), Chief of Azerbaijan's National Central Bureau of Interpol (2004-2006).

Early life 
Guliyev Madat Gazanfar oglu was born on September 27 1958 in Ganja. Guliyev's grandfather, Madat Mashadi Karam oglu Gulubayli (1889-1930), served as Chief of the Ganja City Police Department and was assassinated on the 28th of November as part of the Stalinist Repressions. His father, Gazanfar Guliyev (1923-2013), was an engineer. His mother, Zambag Eminbayli, is a scholar of Azerbaijani language and literature.

In 1965, Guliyev started secondary school #1 in Ganja and graduated from school #7 in 1975. In 1974, Guliyev competed for Azerbaijan’s National Judo Team. In 1978, Guliyev became the honoured "Master of Sports of the USSR" in Judo and Sambo and attained the 7th Dan black belt in Karate. Guliyev graduated from the Azerbaijan State Institute of Physical Training and Sport in 1980 and attained a law degree from the Police Academy of the Ministry of Internal Affairs of the Republic of Azerbaijan in 1997.

He is married and has four children.

Career

 In 1983, joined the Ministry of Internal Affairs of the Republic of Azerbaijan;
 From 1992 to 1994, served as the Chief of Combat Terrorism and Banditism Department;
In 1993, suffered a deadly gunshot during a shoot-out. Carried on with the operation and successfully neutralised the criminals;
 From 1994 to 1995, served as the Chief of Yevlakh-Gazakh Regional Department of Combat Organized Crimes Directorate of MIA; eradicated all Organised Crime Units (OCUs) and Racketeering in Azerbaijan;
 From 2001 to 2002, served as Chief of Combat Organized Crimes and Racketeering;
From 2002 to 2004, served as Chief of Combat Narcotics of the Chief Directorate of MIA;
 On June 30 2005, received the rank of police major-general for protection of the Constitution of Azerbaijan and its statehood, for combat against crime and gangsterism, for personal participation in detention and rendering harmless of recidivist criminals in intergovernmental search and for special services in combating transnational crime;
From 2004 to 2006, served as Chief of Azerbaijan's National Central Bureau of Interpol;
 From 2006 to 2011, served as the Chief of the Main Security Directorate of MIA;
In 2011, was appointed Deputy Minister of Justice and Chief of Penitentiary Service of the Republic of Azerbaijan;
In 2015, was appointed Deputy Minister of National Security and acting Minister of National Security;
From 2015 to 2019, served as the Chief Executive of State Security Agency;
In 2019, was appointed the Minister of Defence Industry by the presidential decree dated 20 June

Social Advocacy 

 Vice President of the Azerbaijan Automobile Federation
 President of the Azerbaijan Cycling Federation since 2021

Awards
National Hero of Azerbaijan - 26 December 1995, for exceptional merit and bravery in defence and strengthening of the Republic of Azerbaijan 

Lieutenant-general of Justice - 20 November 2012.

3rd Degree For service to the Fatherland Order – 20 November 2014

2nd Degree For service to the Fatherland Order – 26 March 2018 

 Colonel General - 26 September 2018

See also 
 Cabinet of Azerbaijan
 Ministry of Internal Affairs
 Ministry of National Security of Azerbaijan
 Eldar Mahmudov
 State Security Service
 President of Azerbaijan

References

External links 
 Azerbaijan – December 2015
 http://flnka.ru/english/news/11703-mns-ceases-to-exist.html
 Two New Deputy Defense Ministers Appointed 
 Azerbaijani president appoints new first deputy minister of national security

Lieutenant generals
Azerbaijani generals
Military personnel from Ganja, Azerbaijan
Living people
1958 births